Cae Llwyd is a reservoir located between Llwyneinion and the Ruabon Moors in Wrexham County Borough, Wales.

Description 
The reservoir is an impounded lake holding raw water. It is dammed with a soil embankment consisting of a puddle clay core.

The plans are described to be "commendably brief", only containing seven items. One of the drawings was later found in 1984 to have been drawn on the back of a print for various Mersey crossing proposals including a suspension bridge and two tunnels.
The reservoir was constructed in 1878 by the Wrexham Waterworks Company, it is operated by Hafren Dyfrdwy on behalf of Severn Trent.

The reservoir is part of the Ty Mawr/Cae Llwyd/Pen-y-Cae Reservoir System, one of the two reservoir systems by Hafren Dyfrdwy to supply the Wrexham Resource Zone.

There is a Scouting site located next to the reservoir.

See also 
List of lakes of Wales

References 

Lakes of Wales
Bodies of water of Wrexham County Borough